Edward Ottis "Pinky" Swander (July 4, 1880 - October 24, 1944) was a Major League Baseball outfielder. He played parts of two seasons in the majors for the St. Louis Browns. His minor league baseball career spanned fifteen seasons, from  until .

Sources

Major League Baseball right fielders
St. Louis Browns players
Newport News Shipbuilders players
Portsmouth Browns players
Indianapolis Indians players
Newark Sailors players
Waterbury Authors players
Waterbury Invincibles players
Oakland Oaks (baseball) players
Springfield Ponies players
Springfield Tips players
Baseball players from Ohio
People from Portsmouth, Ohio
1880 births
1944 deaths